George Gardiner may refer to:

George Gardiner (priest) (1535–1589), English Dean of Norwich
George Gardiner (settler) (c. 1610–c. 1677), early settler of Newport, Rhode Island
George Gardiner (VC) (1821–1891), recipient of the Victoria Cross
George Gardiner (politician) (1935–2002), British politician
George Gardiner (boxer) (1877–1954), Irish-American boxer
George Gardiner (cricketer) (1914–1989), Australian cricketer
George R. Gardiner (1917–1997), financier and founder of Gardiner Museum
George Gardiner (RAF officer) (1892–1940), World War I flying ace
George Gardiner (wrestler) (1900–1924), British wrestler
George Gardiner (folk-song collector) (1852–1910), collector of folk songs in Southern England
George Gardiner (footballer) (1877–1933), Australian rules footballer

See also
George Gardner (disambiguation)